Charles Howlett may refer to:

 Charles Howlett (1885–1932) Dental surgeon, politician and amateur actor
 Charlie Howlett (1864–1903) English footballer for Sheffield United
 Charlie Howlett (footballer, born 1906) (1906–1990) English footballer, for Durham City, Rochdale and Halifax Town